Desperate Farewell is a 1955 Italian melodrama film directed by Lionello De Felice and starring Massimo Girotti, Lise Bourdin and Andrea Checchi. It is a medical drama based on a novel by Andrea Majocchi.

Cast
 Massimo Girotti as Dott. Andrea Pitti
 Lise Bourdin as Luisa Bozzi
 Andrea Checchi as Dott. Maurizio Marini
 Xenia Valderi as Anna
 Jane Hugo
 Marcella Rovena
 Emma Baron
 Nanda Primavera as Zia di Luisa
 Renato Malavasi
 Alessandro Fersen
 Aldo Silvani
 Augusto Pennella as Giorgio - figlio di Luisa
 Laura Gore
 Gisella Monaldi
 Eros Macchi
 Rita Livesi
 Nietta Zocchi

References

Bibliography
 Goble, Alan. The Complete Index to Literary Sources in Film. Walter de Gruyter, 1999.

External links

1955 films
1955 drama films
Italian drama films
French drama films
1950s Italian-language films
Films directed by Lionello De Felice
Films scored by Carlo Rustichelli
Melodrama films
Italian black-and-white films
1950s Italian films
1950s French films